The Myth of Prometheus is a series of two panels painted by Piero di Cosimo, executed in 1515. It shows Prometheus standing before a life-size statue. 

1515 paintings
Collection of the Alte Pinakothek
Paintings by Piero di Cosimo
Paintings depicting Greek myths
Paintings in the collection of the Musée des Beaux-Arts de Strasbourg
Prometheus